Daventry was a railway station serving the town of Daventry in Northamptonshire, England. It was on the Weedon to Leamington Spa branch line. The station opened on 1 March 1888 when a branch from the main line at Weedon reached the town. This line was extended in 1895 to reach Leamington Spa.

The station was located to the east of the town centre, and was made mostly from wood. It was on a passing loop and had two platforms linked by a footbridge. The main station building was located on the down (westbound) platform, with a small waiting room on the up platform. Adjacent to the station were some goods sidings. The station was closed to passengers on 15 September 1958, however the line remained open for freight until 2 December 1963.

Nothing now remains of the station. It was demolished in January 1968, and the A425 Daventry bypass built over the site. However some of the former trackbed to the north of the station remains in use as a footpath and cycleway.

Long Buckby

Model
A scale model of Daventry station made by Roger Bagnall is exhibited at the Daventry town museum.

References

External links 
 Photographs of Daventry station - flickr.com
 Daventry station on navigable 1954 O. S. map

Disused railway stations in Northamptonshire
Railway stations in Great Britain opened in 1888
Railway stations in Great Britain closed in 1958
Former London and North Western Railway stations
Daventry
Buildings and structures demolished in 1968
Demolished buildings and structures in England